Emma Murray (born 23 February 1978) is a former Australian female mountain runner, twice world champion at the World Long Distance Mountain Running Championships (2005, 2006).

References

External links
 Emma Murray at Association of Road Racing Statisticians

1978 births
Living people
Australian female long-distance runners
Australian female mountain runners
World Long Distance Mountain Running Championships winners